Panchayatana comes from the Sanskrit  pañca 'five' and āyatana 'altar'.

 Panchayatana puja is an act of worship (puja) of five deities: Shiva, Vishnu, Devi, Surya and Ganesha.
 A Panchayatana temple is a Hindu temple with five shrines.